María Dolores Herrera Arranz MML (June 30, 1935) better known as Lola Herrera is an awarded Spanish actress.

Biography 

She was born in the Barrio de Las Delicias, Valladolid, Castilla y León. She started in the world of music, but in the 1950s, she went to Madrid and took part in her first movie El pórtico de la gloria (1953).

In the 1970s, she took part in several theatrical plays for Televisión Española. She was one of the habitual actors of the cast of Estudio 1 and collaborated with Chicho Ibáñez Serrador in Historias para no dormir (1968). She also worked as a voice actress in dubbing Spanish versions made in studios like Cineson or Exa (Madrid).

She is mainly known for her appearances in television series like La casa de los líos El grupo or Un paso adelante, but she has taken part in several movies like El amor perjudica seriamente la salud, and in theatrical plays like Cinco horas con Mario, based in a Miguel Delibes novel.

She married the actor Daniel Dicenta (Manuel Dicenta’s son) in 1967. They had two children, Natalia and Daniel, before their divorce. Natalia Dicenta is also a famous actress, and they both have worked together in plays like "All About Eve" or Solas.

Selected filmography

Television 
Un paso adelante (2002–2005)			
La casa de los líos (1997–2000)  			
Paraíso
 (August 16, 2000)
El grupo (2000)				
El Señor Villanueva y su gente (1979)  		
La Barraca (1979)	
Las Viudas (1977)				
El quinto jinete  				
Mister George (January 1, 1976)    			
El Teatro  			
Hay una luz sobre la cama (October 28, 1974)    		
Verano y humo (November 25, 1974)    			
Ficciones  			
Los ojos de la pantera (May 20, 1974)    		
Noche de teatro  				
Los tres etcéteras de Don Simón (May 3, 1974)    	
Historias de Juan Español  			
Juan Español, aprensivo (November 22, 1972)    		
Juan Español y Lolita (October 1, 1973)    		
Las doce caras de Eva  				
Acuario (January 1, 1972)    				
Del dicho al hecho				
El que a hierro mata, a hierro muere (May 26, 1971) 	
Hora once  				
Yanko, el músico (May 6, 1971)    			
Adolescencia (February 19, 1972)    			
El recluta (March 11, 1972)    			
Las paredes oyen (October 29, 1973)    			
Juegos para Mayores  				
Gente divertida (March 1, 1971)    			
Sospecha  			
La trampa (November 9, 1970)    			
Mientras llega la noche (January 9, 1971) 			
La risa española  				
Todos eran de Toronto (June 20, 1969)    		
Qué solo me dejas (July 18, 1969)    			
Pequeño estudio  				
La herida (January 10, 1969)    			
Los zapatos (June 25, 1969)    			
El Premio  			
La saga (December 2, 1968)    			
Fábulas  				
El cuervo y el zorro (April 14, 1968)    		
Historias para no dormir  			
La casa (January 1, 1968)    				
El trasplante (March 15, 1968) 				
Las doce caras de Juan  			
Aries (December 2, 1967)    				
La otra música  				
La noticia (October 8, 1967)    			
Doce cuentos y una pesadilla  			
Por favor, compruebe el futuro (September 16, 1967)   	
Teatro de siempre, several theatrical plays from 1964 to 1978.

Film
 Cristina Guzmán (1968)
 La Graduada (1971)
 The Cannibal Man (1972)
 La próxima estación (1982)
 Love Can Seriously Damage Your Health (1997)
 Pasaje al amanecer (2017)

Awards

Stage
Max de las artes escénicas, Solas in 2006,
Fotogramas de Plata, Solas in 2006
Fotogramas de Plata, Cinco horas con Mario in 2005
Premio Ercilla de Teatro for her complete career in stages.

Television
 TP de Oro Best Actress for Las Viudas, 1977
 TP de Oro Best Actress for ''La Barraca', 1979

Honours 
 Gold Medal of Merit in Labour (Kingdom of Spain, 2 December 2006).

External links

References 

1935 births
Living people
People from Valladolid
Spanish stage actresses
Spanish film actresses
Spanish television actresses
Spanish voice actresses
20th-century Spanish actresses
21st-century Spanish actresses